Little Inagua National Park is a national park on and around Little Inagua, the Bahamas.

Flora and fauna
The park is a nesting site for sea turtles, and the surrounding waters are important queen conch (Aliger gigas) larval habitat.

References

National parks of the Bahamas
Inagua